Clubiona brevipes (syn.: Clubiona rethymnonis) is a sac spider species with a palearctic distribution.

See also 
 List of Clubionidae species

References

External links 

Clubionidae
Palearctic spiders
Spiders described in 1841